Duane Banks Field is a baseball stadium in Iowa City, Iowa, United States.  It is the home field of the University of Iowa Hawkeyes college baseball team.  The stadium holds 3,000 people and opened in 1974.  It is named after former Iowa Hawkeyes baseball coach Duane Banks.

The venue hosted the 1990 Big Ten Conference baseball tournament, won by Illinois.

The field was renamed in honor of Banks in 2001.  The school has added lights to the field recently, and some high school games are also played there.

Following the 2010 season, the facility received a new playing surface.  Other renovations included new batting cages and increased dimensions and foul territory space.

See also
 List of NCAA Division I baseball venues

References

External links
 Duane Banks Field - University of Iowa

College baseball venues in the United States
Baseball venues in Iowa
University of Iowa campus
1974 establishments in Iowa
Sports venues completed in 1974
Iowa Hawkeyes baseball